Dolin may refer to:

People with the surname

 Anton Dolin (1904–1983), English ballet dancer
 Eric Jay Dolin (born 1961), American author of history books, often focused on maritime topics and wildlife
 Gregory Dolin (fl. 200s–2020s), Associate Justice of the Supreme Court of Palau
 Marty Dolin (1939-2018), Canadian politician in Manitoba, husband of Mary Beth
 Mary Beth Dolin (1936–1985), Canadian politician in Manitoba, wife of Marty
 Samuel Dolin (1917–2002), Canadian composer, music educator, and arts administrator

Other uses
 Dolin (island), in the Croatian part of the Adriatic Sea
 , French distiller

See also
 Dolan (disambiguation)
 Dolen (disambiguation)
Doline (geology), a type of sinkhole leading to an underground river